Telmatobius gigas is a critically endangered species of frog in the family Telmatobiidae. Its tiny range makes it highly vulnerable to pollution, and it may also be threatened by over-harvesting for medicinal use and the disease chytridiomycosis. In the genus Telmatobius, only two other threatened species, the Titicaca water frog (T. culeus) and Lake Junin frog (T. macrostomus), are larger. T. gigas is very closely related to the smaller and more widespread T. marmoratus, and they might be conspecific.

References

gigas
Amphibians of the Andes
Amphibians of Bolivia
Endemic fauna of Bolivia
Taxonomy articles created by Polbot
Amphibians described in 1969